The 2019 Valencian Community motorcycle Grand Prix was the nineteenth and final round of the 2019 MotoGP season. It was held at the Circuit Ricardo Tormo in Valencia on 17 November 2019.

Classification

MotoGP

 Francesco Bagnaia suffered a broken collarbone in a crash during practice and withdrew from the event.
Andrea Iannone was retroactively disqualified on 31 March 2020 as part of his suspension for a failed doping test after the Malaysian Grand Prix.

Moto2

Moto3
The race, scheduled to be run for 21 laps, was red-flagged due to a multiple rider crash . The race was later restarted over 15 laps.

MotoE

Race 1

All bikes manufactured by Energica.

Race 2

All bikes manufactured by Energica.

Championship standings after the race

MotoGP

Moto2

Moto3

MotoE

Notes

External links

References

Valencia
Valencian Community motorcycle Grand Prix
Valencian Community motorcycle Grand Prix
21st century in Valencia
Valencian Community motorcycle Grand Prix